is a Japanese actor and voice actor. He started his acting debut in the 1996 Super Sentai series, Gekisou Sentai Carranger as Kyosuke Jinnai/Red Racer Since then, he has become a very prominent voice actor in both Anime and video games. He is more prominently known as the main voice actor for Ken Masters in the Street Fighter series of video games produced by Capcom.

Filmography

Film
Mayonaka no Yaji-san Kita-san (God of Laughter) (voice)

Tokusatsu
Gekisou Sentai Carranger (Kyōsuke Jinnai/Red Racer)
Gekisou Sentai Carranger vs. Ohranger (Kyōsuke Jinnai/Red Racer)
Denji Sentai Megaranger vs. Carranger (Kyōsuke Jinnai/Red Racer)
Seijuu Sentai Gingaman (Shunsuke Kishimoto)
Hyakujuu Sentai Gaoranger (Camera Org (ep. 3)) (voice)
Ninpuu Sentai Hurricaneger (Kazuma Namekawa)
Ninpuu Sentai Hurricanger vs. Gaoranger (Chubouzu) (Voice)
Tokusou Sentai Dekaranger (Dragian Ganymede (ep. 49 - 50)) (voice)
GoGo Sentai Boukenger (Wicked Dragon Tagargin (ep. 45)) (voice)
Jyuken Sentai Gekiranger vs. Boukenger (Confrontation Beast-Hippopotamus Fist Baka) (Voice)
Engine Sentai Go-onger (Savage Sky Barbaric Machine Beast Dumbbell Banki (ep. 46)) (voice)
Kaizoku Sentai Gokaiger (Kyōsuke Jinnai (ep. 14))
Shuriken Sentai Ninninger Vs. Kamen Rider Drive Spring Vacation Combining Special (Dr. D/Spider-Type Roidmude 089 (voice)/Youkai Buruburu (voice))

Television animation
Beast Wars II: Super Life-Form Transformers (Scuba(Squid), Drill Nuts(Weevil))
Ghost in the Shell: Stand Alone Complex
Hunter × Hunter (1999) (Kite, Gozu, Kastro, Pietro)
Idaten Jump (Arthur the Biker Knight)
I My Me! Strawberry Eggs! (Hibiki Amawa)
Kochira Katsushika-ku Kameari Kōen-mae Hashutsujo (Saigō Volvo)
Kyoshiro to Towa no Sora (Sōjirō)
Les Misérables: Shōjo Cosette (Enjolras)
Saikano (Kazu)
X-Men: Evolution (Lance Alvers/Avalanche (Christopher Grey), Colossus (Michael Adamthwaite), Duncan Matthews (Vincent Gale))
Yu-Gi-Oh! Duel Monsters (Tetsu Ushio)
Yu-Gi-Oh! Duel Monsters GX (Freed the Brave Wanderer)

Original video animation (OVA)
Final Fantasy VII Advent Children (Yazoo)
Tsubasa: Reservoir Chronicle: Tokyo Revelation (Fuma)
Tsubasa: Reservoir Chronicle: Spring Thunder (Fuma)

Video games
Crash Bandicoot: The Wrath of Cortex (Crunch Bandicoot) (Kevin Michael Richardson)
Crash Nitro Kart (Crunch Bandicoot) (Kevin Michael Richardson)
JoJo's Bizarre Adventure (N'Doul)
GioGio's Bizarre Adventure (Polpo), (Formaggio)
SNK vs. Capcom series (Ken - not SVC Chaos: SNK vs. Capcom)
Street Fighter III 3rd Strike: Fight for the Future (Ken Masters)
Suikoden IV (Ramada, Count Fingāfūto)
Tales of Symphonia: Dawn of the New World (Hawk)
Ys I & II (Darm)
Street Fighter IV (Ken Masters)
Super Street Fighter IV (Ken Masters)
Super Street Fighter IV: 3D Edition (Ken Masters)
Street Fighter X Tekken (Ken Masters)
Ultra Street Fighter IV (Ken Masters)
Street Fighter V (Ken Masters)
Street Fighter 6 (Ken Masters)
Project X Zone (Ken Masters)
Project X Zone 2 (Ken Masters)
Super Smash Bros. Ultimate (Ken Masters, Mii Fighter Type 1)

Drama CDs
Denkou Sekka Boys (Kyouichirou Yasaka)

Dubbing

Live-action
Jack Reacher (Charlie (Jai Courtney))
Mary Poppins Returns (Jack (Lin-Manuel Miranda))
Power Rangers Turbo (Theodore Jay Jarvis Johnson (Selwyn Ward))
Power Rangers in Space (Theodore Jay Jarvis Johnson (Selwyn Ward), Dark Specter (Christopher Cho), Black Alien Ranger)
Power Rangers Lost Galaxy (Theodore Jay Jarvis Johnson, Ironite)
The Sound of Music (50th Anniversary edition) (Rolfe (Daniel Truhitte))
Torque (Cary Ford (Martin Henderson))

Animation
Wreck-It Ralph (Ken Masters) (Reuben Langdon)

Theatre
Les Misérables - Ensemble, Brujon (2003-2006), Enjolras (2005–2007), Javert (2015-2017)
Miss Saigon - Ensemble, Schultz (2004), John (2008-2009)
The Secret Garden - Mr. Craven
Rudolf - Emperor Wilhelm II (2008)
Sunday in the Park with George - Soldier (2009)
Rock'n Jam Musical (2009)
Elisabeth - Elmer (2010-2012)
The Three Musketeers - Portos (2011)
Legend of the Galactic Heroes - Stefan Neumann (2011), Ulrich Kesler (2012), Gregor Von Kulmbach (2013)
Bonnie & Clyde - Frank Hamer (2012)
Next to Normal - Dan (2013)
The Count of Monte Cristo - Jacopo (2013)
Vincent Van Gogh - Theo (2016)
Little Shop of Horrors - Mr. Mushnik (2020)

References

External links
Code Red (Japanese)
Mausu Promotion profile (Japanese)
 
 
 Yūji Kishi at GamePlaza-Haruka Voice Acting Database 
 Yūji Kishi at Hitoshi Doi's Seiyuu Database

1970 births
Living people
Japanese male musical theatre actors
Japanese male video game actors
Japanese male voice actors
Male voice actors from Tokyo
20th-century Japanese male actors
21st-century Japanese male actors